Aphanitoma locardi is a species of sea snail, a marine gastropod mollusk in the family Borsoniidae.

Description
The height of the shell attains 11 mm.

Distribution
This marine species occurs off Western Morocco and southwestern Portugal.

References

 Bavay A. (1906). Mollusques trouvés dans les résidus de dragages du Travailleur. Bulletin du Muséum d'Histoire Naturelle 12: 547–549 
 Sykes E. R., 1911: On the Mollusca procured during the Porcupine expeditions. Supplementary notes, part IV ; Proceedings of the Malacological Society of London 9: 331–348

External links
 

Aphanitoma
Gastropods described in 1906